The Seattle Cup is a traveling trophy awarded to the winner of the annual men's college soccer match between Seattle University and the University of Washington. Washington leads the all-time series, 44–8–5. The cup was first awarded in 2016.

In the event of a draw, the cup remains in the possession of the school holding it prior to the match. The cup is presented to the winning team by the Washington Athletic Club and the 101 Club.

The rivalry has seen more media attention ever since Seattle U has reinstated its men's soccer program at the NCAA Division I level and has been competitive in the NCAA Division I Men's Soccer Tournament.

Match results

See also 
 Milwaukee Cup and Rowdies Cup, two similar city cup tournaments

References

College soccer rivalries in the United States
College soccer rivalry trophies in the United States
1967 establishments in Washington (state)
Recurring sporting events established in 1967
Seattle Redhawks men's soccer
Washington Huskies men's soccer
Soccer in Seattle